Nelson Mandela School may refer to

 Nelson Mandela School, Berlin, Germany
 Nelson Mandela Primary School, in Birmingham, United Kingdom
 Nelson Mandela University, university in Port Elizabeth, South Africa (formerly Nelson Mandela Metropolitan University)
 Nelson Mandela Academic Hospital, a teaching hospital in Mthatha, South Africa
 Nelson Mandela High School, in Waterloo, Sierra Leone
 Nelson Mandela African Institute of Science and Technology, university in Arusha, Tanzania
 Nelson Mandela High School, in Calgary, Alberta, Canada

See also
 Nelson Mandela (disambiguation)